Arrivillaga are two blocks with about 25 houses located 800 metres west of Juan Lacaze of Colonia Department, Uruguay.

Geography
The village belongs to the sector 14, an administrative subdivision of the Colonia Department. The stream Arroyo Sauce lies near Arrivillaga.

Population
According to the 2011 census, Arrivillaga had a population of 112.
 
Source: Instituto Nacional de Estadística de UruguaySource: Instituto Nacional de Estadística de Uruguay

References

External links 
 Map of Juan Lacaze and Arrivillaga

Populated places in the Colonia Department